Your Tender Loving Care is an album by Buck Owens and his Buckaroos, released in 1967.

It was re-released on CD in 1995 by Sundazed Records with two bonus tracks.

Reception

In his Allmusic review, critic Greg Adams wrote of the CD reissue "Despite the impression that it is a collection of leftovers, the singularity of Owens' stylistic vision prevents the album from seeming like a hodgepodge. No surprises await the faithful, but this is solid material."

Track listing
All songs by Buck Owens unless otherwise noted.

Side one
 "Your Tender Loving Care" – 2:45
 "Song and Dance" – 2:05
 "Only You (Can Break My Heart)" – 2:19
 "What a Liar I Am" – 2:41
 "Someone With No One to Love" (Buck Owens, Red Simpson) – 2:19
 "Rocks in My Head" – 2:16

Side two
 "Sam's Place" (Owens, Simpson) – 2:00
 "If I Had You Back Again" – 2:54
 "House of Memories" (Merle Haggard) – 2:57
 "Only You (And You Alone)" (Robert J. Wooten) – 2:14
 "Don't Ever Tell Me Goodbye" (Owens, Simpson) – 2:32
 "You Made a Monkey Out of Me" (Owens and Don Rich) – 2:05
1995 bonus tracks:
 "Your Tender Loving Care" – 2:46
 "Sam's Place" (Owens, Simpson) – 1:59

References

External links
Reissue review at No Depression magazine.

1967 albums
Buck Owens albums
Capitol Records albums
Albums produced by Ken Nelson (United States record producer)
Sundazed Records albums

Albums recorded at Capitol Studios